Coleophora musculella is a moth of the family Coleophoridae. It is found from Poland to the Pyrenees and from France to Hungary.

The larvae feed on Dianthus carthusianorum and Dianthus superbus. They create a trivalved tubular silken case of 5–6 mm, with a mouth angle of 35–40°. The case is yellowish brown with a number of brownish black length lines. Larvae can be found from September to May.

References

musculella
Moths described in 1864
Moths of Europe